Airosperma is a genus of flowering plants in the family Rubiaceae. It was described by Karl Moritz Schumann and Carl Adolf Georg Lauterbach in 1900. It contains 6 accepted species, all endemic either to New Guinea or to Fiji.

Species 
 Airosperma fuscum S.Moore - Papua New Guinea
 Airosperma grandifolia Valeton - Papua New Guinea
 Airosperma psychotrioides K.Schum. & Lauterb. - Papua New Guinea
 Airosperma ramuensis K.Schum. & Lauterb. - Papua New Guinea
 Airosperma trichotomum (Gillespie) A.C.Sm. - Viti Levu
 Airosperma vanuense S.P.Darwin - Vanua Levu, Taveuni

References

External links 
 Airosperma in the World Checklist of Rubiaceae

Rubiaceae genera
Airospermeae